Rous may refer to:
 Baron Rous, in the peerage of Great Britain
 R.O.U.S., or "Rodent of Unusual Size," a creature from the book and film The Princess Bride
 Rous Cup, a football competition

Places 
Australia
 Rous, New South Wales
 Rous County, New South Wales
 Rous River, New South Wales
 Electoral district of Rous, New South Wales

People 
 Anthony Rous (1605–1677), English politician
 Didier Rous (born 1970), French professional road bicycle racer
 Edmund Rous (by 1521-1569 or later), English politician
 Elie Rous (born 1909), English, or French, football manager
 Francis Rous (1579–1659), English politician and a prominent Puritan
 Francis Peyton Rous (1879–1970), American pathologist and Nobel Prize recipient
 Henry John Rous (1795–1877), Royal Navy officer and sportsman
 John Rous (disambiguation)
 Samuel H. Rous (1864–1947), American singer who performed as S. H. Dudley
 Stanley Rous (1895–1986), the 6th President of FIFA
 William Rous (disambiguation)